Stefano Cupilli, C.R.S. (1659–1719) was a Roman Catholic prelate who served as Archbishop of Split (1708–1719) and Bishop of Trogir (1699–1708).

Biography
Stefano Cupilli was born in Venice, Italy on 19 November 1659 and ordained a deacon on 12 June 1683 and ordained a priest on 11 July 1683 in the Clerks Regular of Somasca.
On 1 June 1699, he was appointed during the papacy of Pope Innocent XII as Bishop of Trogir.
On 8 June 1699, he was consecrated bishop by Marcantonio Barbarigo, Bishop of Corneto e Montefiascone, with Stephanus Cosimi, Archbishop of Split, and Tommaso Guzzoni, Bishop of Sora, serving as co-consecrators. 
On 12 March 1708, he was appointed during the papacy of Pope Clement XI as Archbishop of Split.
He served as Archbishop of Split until his death on 11 December 1719.

Episcopal succession
While bishop, he was the principal consecrator of:
Matthieu Giannicio, Bishop of Scardona (1717); and the principal co-consecrator of:
Giovanni Battista Braschi, Bishop of Sarsina (1699).

References

External links and additional sources
 (for Chronology of Bishops)
 (for Chronology of Bishops)
 (for Chronology of Bishops) 
 (for Chronology of Bishops) 

17th-century Roman Catholic bishops in Croatia
18th-century Roman Catholic bishops in Croatia
Bishops appointed by Pope Innocent XII
Bishops appointed by Pope Clement XI
1659 births
1719 deaths
Republic of Venice clergy
Somascan bishops
18th-century Roman Catholic bishops in the Holy Roman Empire
Italian expatriate bishops